Thomas John Gore (born 26 November 1953) is an English former footballer who played as a midfielder. He played 257 league appearances in a six-year career in the Football League.

He began his career at Liverpool, playing in the 1972 FA Youth Cup final. He later joined Tranmere Rovers, before signing with Wigan Athletic in January 1974. He helped the club to the Northern Premier League title in 1974–75, as well as second-place finishes in 1973–74 and 1977–78, before Wigan were granted Football League status in 1978. Voted the club's player of the year in 1978–79, he moved on to Bury in October 1980. During his time at Wigan he also spent two summers in the United States with Dallas Tornado. He switched to Port Vale in July 1983, before a neck injury forced his retirement in October 1984.

Career
Gore played youth football for Liverpool, playing for the "Reds" in the 1972 FA Youth Cup final defeat to Aston Villa. He moved on to Tranmere Rovers, before joining Wigan Athletic in January 1974. He made 185 Northern Premier League appearances for Wigan, as they finished as runners-up in 1973–74, champions in 1974–75, sixth in 1975–76, 14th in 1976–77, and then second again in 1977–78. He also spent the 1974 and 1975 summers in the North American Soccer League with Dallas Tornado. He played against Hereford United in Wigan's first ever Football League game and scored in a 1–1 draw at Tranmere Rovers in a Football League Cup first round first leg fixture on 12 August 1978, which was Wigan's first competitive goal as a professional club. He was an ever-present in Ian McNeill's side throughout the 1978–79 Fourth Division campaign. He also voted as the "Latics" first ever Player of the Year. In the 1979–80 season, he scored the winning goal for Wigan against Chelsea in the third round of the FA Cup. He was suddenly transferred to Bury in October 1980, having made 102 consecutive league appearances since the club's first Football League fixture.

Manager Jim Iley led the "Shakers" to 12th in the Fourth Division in 1980–81, ninth in 1981–82, and fifth in 1982–83, just one place and two points behind promoted club Scunthorpe United.

Gore joined Port Vale in July 1983 after manager John McGrath secured the midfielder on a free transfer. He made 43 appearances for "Valiants" in 1983–84, scoring three goals, as new manager John Rudge failed to prevent relegation out of the Third Division. He suffered a neck injury in a League Cup game against former club Bury in August 1984, which forced his retirement two months later.

Post-retirement
After retiring, Gore owned and ran a snooker club in Wigan for eight years. He now lives in Billinge and runs a cleaning company providing cleaning services on board ships. An accomplished golfer, he became club captain at Dean Wood Golf Club. He has also worked as a co-commentator on Wish FM and iFollow Latics.

Career statistics
Source:

Honours
Individual
Wigan Athletic player of the year: 1978–79

Liverpool
FA Youth Cup runner-up: 1972

Wigan Athletic
Northern Premier League: 1974–75

References

1953 births
Living people
Footballers from Liverpool
English footballers
Association football midfielders
Liverpool F.C. players
Tranmere Rovers F.C. players
Wigan Athletic F.C. players
Dallas Tornado players
Bury F.C. players
Port Vale F.C. players
Northern Premier League players
English Football League players
North American Soccer League (1968–1984) players
English expatriate sportspeople in the United States
Expatriate soccer players in the United States
English expatriate footballers
English association football commentators